Kate Just (born 1974) is an American-born Australian artist.

Background and education 
Kate Just was born in Hartford, Connecticut in 1974, but moved to Melbourne, Australia in 1994. Just works in knitting, sculpture, ceramic media and photography. She holds a PhD in sculpture from Monash University, a Master of Arts from RMIT University, and a Bachelor of Fine Arts in painting from the Victorian College of the Arts. For her PhD research project, The Texture of her Skin,  she was awarded the Mollie Hollman Doctoral Medal for the best PhD in Art Design and Architecture. Kate Just has been working as a Lecturer in Art at the Victorian College of the Arts Art since 2005.

Kate Just began knitting in 2000 following a tragic family loss. As part of her grieving process, her mother taught her to knit. Just believes that knitting is a powerful personal, political, poetic and narrative tool and claims that her knitted artworks are autobiographical as they explore childhood and biographical experiences.

Work 
Just creates elaborate large-scale knitted sculptures, as well as works in resin, clay, collage and photo-based media. Just's work deals with feminist representations of the body. Her use of knitting in many of her works casts craft as a highly engaging and valid form of sculpture as well as a poetic or political tool. Just has also created a number of socially engaged projects and public works in urban communities regarding violence against women.

Exhibitions
Just's work has been exhibited in over a hundred solo and group exhibitions in Australia, including  Craft Victoria, Gertrude Contemporary, Centre for Contemporary Photography, Melbourne Art Fair, Contemporary Art Space of Tasmania, Perth Institute of Contemporary Art, and Canberra Contemporary Art Space. Internationally, her work has been exhibited in galleries in New York, Finland, China, Austria, Tokyo (Japan), New Delhi (India), New Zealand and in the US.

In 2018, Just's work was included in an exhibition of word art in the Hugo Mitchell Gallery in Adelaide.

In collections
The banners Safe and Hope are proudly part of the Wangaratta Art Gallery Collection.

Paradise, a life-sized knitted installation depicting a woman in a  T-shirt and denim cut-off jeans, referencing the abduction of Persephone, is in the collection of the Ararat Gallery TAMA.

Kate Just's work is also in the collections of the National Gallery of Australia, the Ergos Collection in Sydney, Artbank and the City of Port Phillip as well as in private collections in Australia, New Zealand, UK, USA and Austria.

Awards

Shortlist 
 Beleura National Works on Paper Prize (2010) 
 The Woollahra Small Sculpture Prize (2009) 
 The Blake Prize (2009)

Recipient 
 Siemens-RMIT Fine Art Scholarship (2006) 
 Mollie Hollman Doctoral Medal for the best PhD in Art Design and Architecture, Monash University (2013) 
 Wangaratta Contemporary Textile Award (2015) awarded by the Wangaratta Art Gallery 
 Asialink Residency, Sanskriti Kendra, New Delhi, India (2016)

References

External links 
 

1974 births
Australian women artists
Living people